The 2000 municipal elections of the Halifax Regional Municipality in Nova Scotia, Canada, took place on 21 October 2000. Elections have been held every four years since the amalgamation of the cities of Halifax and Dartmouth, the town of Bedford and Halifax County into the Halifax Regional Municipality in 1996. The regional council is made up of twenty three councillors and one mayor, all positions were up for election.

There are no political parties at the municipal level in Nova Scotia, so all candidates run as independents.

Halifax Regional Municipality Mayor

District 1: Eastern Shore - Musquodoboit Valley

District 2: Waverley - Dutch Settlement

District 3: Preston - Porter's Lake

District 4: Cole Harbour North - Cherry Brook

District 5: Eastern Passage - Cole Harbour South

District 6: Westphal - Waverley Road

District 7: Woodlawn

District 8: Woodside

District 9: Albro Lake - Harbourview

District 10: Dartmouth Centre

District 11: Halifax North End

District 12: Halifax Downtown

District 13: Northwest Arm - South End

District 14: Connaught - Quinpool

District 15: Fairview - Clayton Park

District 16: Prince's Lodge - Clayton Park West

District 17: Purcell's Cove - Armdale

District 18: Spryfield - Herring Cove

District 19: Upper Sackville - Beaverbank

District 20: Lower Sackville

District 21: Bedford

District 22: Hammonds Plains - Timberlea

District 23: Prospect- St. Margaret's Bay

References

2000 elections in Canada
Municipal elections in the Halifax Regional Municipality
Politics of Halifax, Nova Scotia